Muratbey can refer to:

 Muratbey, Bartın
 Muratbey, İnegöl
 Muratbey, Kaynaşlı